Nephrocystin-4 is a protein that in humans is encoded by the NPHP4 gene.

This gene encodes a protein which contains a proline-rich region. The encoded protein may function in renal tubular development and function. 

This protein interacts with nephrocystin. Mutations in this gene are associated with nephronophthisis type 4. Multiple alternative transcript variants have been described but their full-length nature has not been determined.

References

Further reading